Nedumangad Taluk is a Taluk (tehsil) in Thiruvananthapuram district in the Indian state of Kerala. It situated in the eastern part of the Thiruvananthapuram district. It comprises 23 villages and one municipality.

It is bounded on the west by Trivandrum Taluk, on the east by the State of Tamil Nadu, on the south by Neyyattinkara Taluk and on the north by Kollam District.

Settlements
There are 25 villages and one Municipality in this taluk.

Villages
Anad, Aruvikkara, Aryanad, Kallara, Karakulam, Karippooru, Koliyakode, Kurupuzha, Manikkal,  Nedumangad, Nellanad, Palode, Panavoor, Pangode, Peringamala, Pullampara, Theakada, Thennoor, Tholicode, Uzhamalackal, Vamanapuram, Vattappara, Vellanad, Vembayam, Vithura.

Municipalities
There is only one municipality, Nedumangad, which is also the headquarters of the taluk.

References

Geography of Thiruvananthapuram district
Taluks of Kerala